Heterosexualism may refer to: 
 Heterosexism, a system of attitudes, bias, and discrimination in favor of opposite-sex sexuality and relationships
 Heterosexuality, romantic attraction, sexual attraction or sexual behavior between persons of the opposite sex or gender